Amelia Bayntun (31 March 1919 – 19 January 1988) was an English stage and television actress.

Career 
Bayntun started her stage career in 1937, when she joined the Bristol Unity Players. During World War II, she was in Stars in Battledress performing in Italy and Austria after the end of hostilities. In between engagements, she ran a pub with her husband, and occasionally sang as Marie Lloyd at London's Players' Theatre. In 1960 she appeared on stage in Joan Littlewood's production of Sparrers Can't Sing at the Theatre Royal Stratford East, and in its later West End transfer.
She played in the TV series Dixon of Dock Green in early 1962, and in the same year was chosen to play the part of Mrs Blitzein in Lionel Bart's musical Blitz!. In this she became a great hit and played the part for the full 568 performances. After this she was not seen in any major role. She played in a number of Carry On films and on TV, including an episode of On the Buses, usually as an elderly cockney or battleaxe.

Filmography 
 Thunderball (1965) - Mrs Karlski (uncredited)
 Carry On Camping (1969) - Mrs Fussey
 Carry On Loving  (1970) - Corset Lady
 The Railway Children (1970) - Cook (uncredited)
 Carry On At Your Convenience  (1971) - Mrs Spragg (uncredited)
 Carry On Matron  (1972) - Mrs Jenkins
 Carry On Abroad  (1972) - Mrs Tuttle

English TV series 
 Dixon of Dock Green  (1962) - Mrs. Taylor
 The Wednesday Play:
 Tomorrow, Just You Wait (1965) - Ada Gorbet
 The Big Man Coughed and Died (1966) - Mona's mother
 Adam Adamant Lives! (1966) - Charity
 Z-Cars (1969) - Lily Oldham
 On the Buses: 
 Lost Property (1971) - Woman
 Albert! (1971-1972) - Mrs. Ada Bissel (regular role - series 3 & 4)
 Play for Today:
 Edna, the Inebriate Woman (1971) - Jessie, a Tramp
 Man Above Men (1973) - Mrs. Marshall

References

Programme Notes for Adelphi Theatre performance of "Blitz!"

External links
 

1919 births
1988 deaths
English television actresses
English film actresses
English stage actresses
Actresses from Bristol
20th-century English actresses
20th-century British businesspeople